The following are the football events of 1937 throughout the world.

Events
May 2 – Puck van Heel becomes Holland's most capped player when he plays his 57th match for the Netherlands national football team against Belgium. Van Heel earned 64 caps during his career.
Foundation of Air Force Central F.C.
Sunderland AFC win the FA cup final.

Winners club national championship
 Argentina: River Plate
 France: Olympique de Marseille
 Italy: Bologna
 Netherlands: Ajax Amsterdam
 Paraguay: Olimpia Asunción
 Poland: Cracovia
 Romania: Venus București
 Scotland:
Scottish Cup: Celtic
 Soviet Union: see 1937 in Soviet football
 Turkey: Fenerbahçe
 Kingdom of Yugoslavia: Građanski Zagreb

International tournaments
1937 British Home Championship (October 31, 1936 – April 17, 1937)

1937 South American Championship (December 27, 1936 – February 1, 1937)

Births
 January 1 – Vlatko Marković, Yugoslavian international footballer (died 2013)
 February 3 – Alex Young Scottish international footballer (died 2017)
 March 13 – Antonio Betancort, Spanish international footballer (died 2015)
 May 16 – Antonio Rattín, Argentine international footballer
 June 1 – Ezio Pascutti, Italian international footballer (died 2017)
 June 27 – Jules Accorsi, French football player and manager
 June 29 – Yair Nossovsky, Israeli footballer
 July 6 – Ernesto Figueiredo, Portuguese footballer
 July 9 – Josef Vacenovský, Czech forward
 July 12
 Fritz Kehl, Swiss football defender
František Valošek, Czech football player
 July 20 – Ilie Datcu, Romanian goalkeeper and  coach
 August 9 – Hans Nowak, German international footballer (died 2012)
 August 19 – Richard Møller Nielsen, Danish international footballer and manager (died 2014)
 August 22 – Gennadi Matveyev, Soviet international footballer (died 2014)
 November 8
Peter Brabrook, English international footballer (died 2016)
Dragoslav Šekularac, Serbian footballer and manager (d. 2019)
 November 10 – Zdeněk Zikán, Czech football player (d. 2013)
 November 20 – Pim van de Meent, Dutch footballer and manager
 December 6 – Alberto Spencer, Ecuadorian-Uruguayan footballer (died 2006)
 December 20 – Gordon Banks, English international footballer (died 2019)

References

 
Association football by year